The 2015 Ladies Tour of Qatar was the 7th edition of the Ladies Tour of Qatar. It was organised by the Qatar Cycling Federation with technical and sports-related assistance from Amaury Sport Organisation (A.S.O.) under the regulations of the Union Cycliste Internationale (category 2.1). It took place from Tuesday 3 February until Friday 6 February 2015 and consisted of 4 stages. 15 teams of 6 riders took part. The event was broadcast live by beIN Sports.

Teams
15 teams were announced for the race on 27 January 2015.

Australia
France
Italy

Preview
The defending champion and winner of four of the six editions of the race, Kirsten Wild, did not start in the Ladies Tour of Qatar to prepare for the UCI Track Cycling World Championships. 2014 runner-up Amy Pieters took her place as leader of the  squad. Former Tour of Qatar winner Ellen van Dijk and Lizzie Armitstead, who won the 2014 UCI World Cup and a gold medal at the Commonwealth Games led the reinforced  in the race. The  team sent Giorgia Bronzini, the former world champion and Chloe Hosking who had finished twice on the podium. Swedish Emma Johansson and Valentina Scandolara from Italy, winner of the Santos Women's Tour earlier in 2015, were part of the  squad.

Stages

Stage 1
3 February 2015 – Museum of Islamic Art to Dukhan Beach, 

With almost no wind, 87 riders started besides the Museum of Islamic Art in the centre of Doha. After , Xiu Jie Jiang escaped. Later she was caught by the bunch. On the last straight by the beach in Dukhan, Annalisa Cucinotta was led out by her teammates and won the stage ahead of two other Italian riders Giorgia Bronzini and Marta Tagliaferro. As well as wearing the golden leader's jersey, Cucinotta also led the points classification (silver Jersey). Another Italian rider Arianna Fidanza wore the white pearl jersey for the best young rider.

Stage 2
4 February 2015 – Al Zubarah Fort to Madinat ash Shamal, 

The 85 remaining riders took off for the longest stage of the event,  in length, heading north to Madinat ash Shamal. After  the bunch broke up into several groups under the due to cross winds. There was a front group of 16 cyclists and build up an advantage of 3 minutes. Six ladies pushed harder and pulled away: Chloe Hosking, Elisa Longo Borghini (both ), Emma Johansson, Lizzie Armitstead, Ellen van Dijk (both ) and Trixi Worrack. In the final  lap, despite an early solo attempt from van Dijk, the leaders stayed together. Counting on the presence of her teammate Armitstead, van Dijk gave it another go just after the final kilometre mark. Making the best of her power, she would not be caught and made it victoriously to the line for a second stage success in Qatar, by three seconds ahead of Worrack and Armitstead. Winner of the 2011 Ladies Tour of Qatar, van Dijk captured the overall leader's golden jersey by four seconds over Armitstead. The silver jersey also switched shoulders and went to Worrack while Beatrice Bartelloni claimed the Pearl White jersey for the best young rider.

Stage 3
5 February 205 – Souq Waqif to Al Khor Corniche, 
The 85 remaining riders took off for the  stage heading north. Alison Tetrick and Liu Yanan both tried to ride away from the pack in the opening kilometres but their solo efforts only lasted for a few kilometres. With  to go the main favourites rode away. Fourteen ladies gathered together at the front including seven of the top ten riders in the general classification. In the closing moments of the stage, despite the attempts of several riders, around thirty girls bunched up again with just under three kilometres to go. Helped out by her Boels Dolmans teammates, Lizzie Armitstead won the sprint of the group. With the time bonuses won at intermediate sprints and the finish, Armitstead took over the golden leader's jersey from her teammate Ellen van Dijk by eight seconds, with Chloe Hosking a further second back.

Stage 4
6 February 2015 – Sealine Beach Resort to Doha Corniche,

Classification leadership table

Final classifications

General classification

Points classification

Teams classification

See also
2015 in women's road cycling

References

External links

Tour of Qatar
Tour of Qatar
Ladies tour of Qatar
Ladies Tour of Qatar